Anabaptist theology, also known as Anabaptist doctrine, is a theological tradition reflecting the doctrine of the Anabaptist Churches. The major branches of Anabaptist Christianity (inclusive of Mennonites, Amish, Hutterites, Bruderhof, Schwarzenau Brethren, River Brethren and Apostolic Christians) agree on core doctrines but have nuances in practice. While the adherence to doctrine is important in Anabaptist Christianity, living righteously is stressed to a greater degree.

Important sources for Anabaptist doctrine are the Schleitheim Confession and the Dordrecht Confession of Faith, both of which have been held by many Anabaptist Churches throughout history.

Daniel Kauffman, a bishop of the Mennonite Church, codified Anabaptist beliefs in the influential text Doctrines of the Bible, which continues to be widely used in catechesis.

John S. Oyer states that the Old Order Amish have an implicit theology that can be found in their biblical hermeneutics, but take little interest in explicit, formal, and systematic theology. It is easier to find out about their implicit theology in talking with them than reading written documents. According to Oyer, their implicit theology is practical, not theoretical. The most important written source of Amish theology, according to Oyer, is "1001 Questions and Answers on the Christian Life".

The Hutterites possess an account of their belief written by Peter Riedemann (Rechenschafft unserer Religion, Leer und Glaubens) and theological tracts and letters by Hans Schlaffer, Leonhard Schiemer and Ambrosius Spittelmaier are extant.

Overview
From its inception, Anabaptist practice has sought to emulate early Christianity.

For Anabaptists, "ordinances brought one into conformity with the truth of Jesus Christ, whose life, crucifixion, death, and resurrection had so fundamentally altered all of humanity and creation that human beings were now capable of works of loving obedience that revealed the indwelling presence of God in Christ in all people." Seven ordinances have been taught in many traditional Mennonite Anabaptist churches, which include "baptism, communion, footwashing, marriage, anointing with oil, the holy kiss, and the prayer covering."

Baptism

The Anabaptist view of baptism is one of its outstanding features. In their view, baptism was reserved for repentant believers who were aware that their sins had been forgiven, not unknowing infants. In this view they defied both the Roman Catholic Church and the Protestant Reformers. In addition, Anabaptists rejected all Roman Catholic and Magisterial Protestant (Lutheran, Anglican and Reformed) baptism as invalid. They therefore re-baptized those whom they regarded as not having received any Christian initiation at all, and claimed that their baptism after profession of faith was the recipient's first legitimate baptism. Reportedly, one of the first adult baptisms of the Reformation was publicly performed in Zürich, Switzerland, in January 1525. According to the Schleitheim Confession (1527): 
Baptism shall be given to all those who have learned repentance and amendment of life, and who believe truly that their sins are taken away by Christ, and to all those who walk in the resurrection of Jesus Christ, and wish to be buried with Him in death, so that they may be resurrected with Him and to all those who with this significance request it (baptism) of us and demand it for themselves. This excludes all infant baptism, the highest and chief abomination of the Pope. In this you have the foundation and testimony of the apostles. Matt. 28, Mark 16, Acts 2, 8, 16, 19.

The Dordrecht Confession (1632) states, 
Concerning baptism we confess that all penitent believers, who, through faith, regeneration, and the renewing of the Holy Ghost, are made one with God, and are written in heaven, must, upon such Scriptural confession of faith, and renewing of life, be baptized with water, in the most worthy name of the Father, and of the Son, and of the Holy Ghost, according to the command of Christ, and the teaching, example, and practice of the apostles, to the burying of their sins, and thus be incorporated into the communion of the saints; henceforth to learn to observe all things which the Son of God has taught, left, and commanded His disciples.

The concept of believers' baptism drew the main attention of 16th-century Continental Anabaptists, but the mode was also an issue. The majority appear to have taught and practiced baptism by pouring, while a minority practiced baptism by immersion. The writings of Menno Simons seem at times to promote immersion as the proper mode, but his practice was by pouring. Bernhard Rothmann argued for immersion in his Bekentnisse, and Pilgram Marpeck copied this idea into his Vermanung, but weakened the position by accepting pouring or sprinkling as an alternate mode. The mode of baptism was debated by the Hutterites and the Polish Brethren around the turn of the 17th century, and the arguments for immersion by Polish leader Christoph Ostorodt were incorporated into the Racovian Confession of Faith in 1604. Servetus made a strong case for immersion. The Mennonites, Swiss Brethren, South German Anabaptists, and Hutterites were not as concerned about mode, and, while not rejecting immersion, found pouring much more practical and believed it to be the Scriptural mode. As such, Anabaptist denominations such as the Mennonites, Amish and Hutterites use pouring as the mode to administer believer's baptism, whereas Anabaptists of the Schwarzenau Brethren, River Brethren and Apostolic Christian traditions baptize by immersion. 
In the practice of the Apostolic Christian Church, after a seeker receives believer's baptism:

Christology
Christology addresses the person and work of Jesus Christ, relative to his divinity, humanity, and work of salvation. The 16th-century Anabaptists were orthodox Trinitarians accepting both the humanity and divinity of Jesus Christ and salvation through his death on the cross. In the area of his humanity certain Anabaptists adopted somewhat different views, which left them open to charges of heresy. Melchior Hoffman, Menno Simons, Dirk Philips and others held and taught an idea which has been dubbed "celestial flesh". Hans Denck (1500–1527) held a view often called "Logos Christology", but his view was much less influential on the movement as a whole.

In attempting to explain how Jesus Christ's two natures came to be, Menno Simons and Dirk Philips concluded and taught that Jesus did not derive his humanity from Mary. This view has also been called the doctrine of "heavenly flesh" and "Incarnational Christology". In this view they were dependent on Melchior Hoffman, who probably was influenced in this view by Kaspar Schwenkfeld von Ossig. Hoffman wrote, "We have now heard enough that the whole seed of Adam, be it of man, woman, or virgin, is cursed and delivered to eternal death. Now if the body of Jesus Christ was also such flesh and of this seed ... it follows that the redemption has not yet happened. For the seed of Adam belongs to Satan and is the property of the devil." Similarly Menno concluded: "In the same manner the heavenly Seed, namely, the Word of God, was sown in Mary, and by her faith, being conceived in her by the Holy Ghost, became flesh, and was nurtured in her body; and thus it is called the fruit of her womb, that same as a natural fruit or offspring is called the fruit of its natural mother." In 1632, 71 years after the death of Menno Simons, and near the end of the first century of Dutch Anabaptism, mention of Menno's Christology was left out of the Dordrecht Confession of Faith. Not only was the "celestial flesh" doctrine a point of controversy between Mennonites and Protestants in the 16th and early 17th centuries, it was also a source of controversy between Anabaptist groups.

In Poland and the Netherlands, certain Anabaptists denied the Trinity, hence the saying that a Socinian was a learned Baptist (see Socinus). With these, Menno and his followers refused to hold communion. Italian Anabaptism had an anti-trinitarian core but was a part of Anabaptism in general. In his work, Stella showed that movement's connections to Neapolitan spiritualism, (especially Juan de Valdés), but also made the connection to the Marranos as well.

Lovefeast
In Anabaptist churches of the Schwarzenau Brethren tradition and the River Brethren tradition, the Lovefeast includes footwashing, the holy kiss, and communion, in addition to the sharing of a communal meal.

Footwashing
 
After the death of the apostles or the end of the Apostolic Age, the practice was continued.

Mennonite theologian J. C. Wenger stated that “There is no exegetical consideration against the observance of feet washing, for example, which would not also bear against the observance of baptism.”

Holy Kiss
This Apostolic ordinance was enjoined by the early Church Fathers, such as Tertullian who wrote that before leaving a house, Christians are to give the Holy Kiss and say "peace to this house"; the Holy Kiss was exchanged during worship as well. Mennonite theologian and bishop Daniel Kauffman taught that the Anabaptist ordinance of the Holy Kiss was emphasized five times in the Bible by the Apostles, who "aimed to teach their followers the way to attain to the highest degree of Christian perfection, and hence felt called upon to teach every thing that tended to accomplish this result."

Lord's Supper

In the early Anabaptist Schleitheim Confession, breaking of bread is the term used for the Lord's supper, also known as communion or eucharist. The Anabaptist view of the Lord's supper is similar to the Zwinglian or symbolism view. The corporate nature (fellowship, unity) of participation is emphasized to a greater degree than in many communions. Pilgram Marpeck wrote, "As members of one body, we proclaim the death of Christ and bodily union attained by untainted brotherly love." The terminology sacrament is generally rejected. Marpeck further wrote, "The true meaning of communion is mystified and obscured by the word sacrament." In connection with the Lord's supper, many Anabaptists stress the rite of feet washing. Anabaptists locate the presence of Jesus not in the eucharistic elements themselves, but teach that the "mystery of communion with the living Christ in his Supper comes into being by the power of the Spirit, dwelling in and working through the collected members of Christ's Body". As such, in celebrations of Holy Communion, "Anabaptist congregations looked to the living Christ in their hearts and in their midst, who transformed members and elements together into a mysterious communion, creating his Body in many members, ground like grains and crushed like grapes, into one bread and one drink."

Anointing with oil
In a compendium of Anabaptist doctrine, Daniel Kauffman stated:

The Church Polity of the Dunkard Brethren Church, a Conservative Anabaptist denomination in the Schwarzenau Brethren tradition, teaches:

Bible
Anabaptists hold that the entire Bible is the word of God, while insisting that the New Testament is the rule of faith and practice for the Church. Anabaptists Hans Denck and Ludwig Hätzer were responsible for the first translation of the Old Testament Prophets from Hebrew into the German language.

The Amish tradition of Anabaptist Christianity uses the Luther Bible, which contains the Old Testament, Apocrypha, and New Testament; Amish wedding ceremonies include "the retelling of the marriage of Tobias and Sarah in the Apocrypha". The texts regarding the martyrdoms under Antiochus IV in the intertestamental section of the Bible (called the Apocrypha) containing 1 Maccabees and 2 Maccabees are held in high esteem by the Anabaptists, who faced persecution in their history.

Non-Resistance
Most Anabaptist hold that violence is wrong, as is supporting violence though personal actions such as joining the military. This would also include opposition to abortion and capital punishment (cf. consistent life ethic). Conservative Anabaptist denominations, such as the Dunkard Brethren Church, teach:

In 1918, three Hutterite brothers, David, Joseph, and Michael Hofer, and Joseph's brother-in-law Jacob Wipf were imprisoned on Alcatraz for refusal to join the US military.  Two of them, Joseph and Michael Hofer, died in late 1918 shortly after their transfer to a prison at Fort Leavenworth, Kansas. The Bruderhof is another Anabaptist church that is strongly pacifist, believing that personal property is a form of injustice.

According to Harold S. Bender and several of his colleagues, the Anabaptists were "voluntaristic in religious choice, advocates of a church completely free from state influence, biblical literalists, non-participants in any government activity to avoid moral compromise, suffering servant disciples of Jesus who emphasized moral living and who were persecuted and martyred as Jesus had been, and restitutionists who tried to restore pre-Constantinian Christian primitivism".

Schwertler Anabaptists, such as Balthasar Hubmaier, were not nonresistant and supported the government; they even encouraged involvement in government. In light of this, they were not accepted by the mainstream of the Anabaptists as being true adherents of the faith.

Forgiveness
Anabaptist doctrine stresses practicing forgiveness. For example, in instances where drivers of automobiles get into accidents with horse-drawn buggies resulting in the deaths of Old Order Amish people, among other situations, their families forgive the perpetrator. In cases of accidents, Old Order Amish often are contacted by lawyers who encourage them to file lawsuits; the Old Order Amish reject these overtures as being in conflict with their Christian religious beliefs, holding that "We don't believe in taking advantage of someone and taking their money". Reflecting the principles of peace and nonresistance, Anabaptist religious beliefs do not permit the filing of lawsuits (cf. ). Representatives of the Old Order Amish community have said that they "would rather be short on the money" than file a lawsuit.

Modesty and woman's veiling

Anabaptist Christianity stresses the importance of modesty, with traditional Anabaptist communities practicing this in the form of plain dress. The influential Mennonite bishop Daniel Kauffman, who codified the Anabaptist theological text Manual of Bible Doctrines, explains that there are two categories of humans: "(1) those that follow the 'lust of the flesh, the lust of the eye, and the pride of life'—the world; (2) those that take Christ as their foundation, and allow their lives to be governed by principles of right—the body of Christ. The simple admonition of our text to those that constitute the body of Christ is, 'Do not allow yourself to become like the world.'" The transformation spoken of in Romans 12:2, according to Kauffman, involves this concept: "Whenever there is a change of mind, there is a change in all things subject to the mind." Furthermore,  references being "unspotted from the world", which Daniel Kauffman references to explain the reason behind the wearing of plain dress by adherents of Old Order Anabaptist and Conservative Anabaptist communities: 

Indeed, in the early Christian manual Paedagogus, the injunction for clothing to extend past the knees was enjoined. With the adjective kosmios (κόσμιος) meaning "modest",  uses the Greek word catastola katastolé (καταστολῇ) for the apparel suitable for Christian females, and for this reason, women belonging to Conservative Anabaptist denominations often wear a cape dress with a headcovering; for example, ladies who are members of the Charity Christian Fellowship wear the cape dress with an opaque hanging veil as the denomination teaches that "the sisters are to wear a double layered garment as the Greek word 'catastola' describes."

A Conservative Anabaptist publication titled The Significance of the Christian Woman's Veiling, authored by Merle Ruth, teaches with regard to the continual wearing of the headcovering by believing women, that it is:

Anabaptist expositor Daniel Willis, cites the Early Church Father John Chrysostom's explication of Saint Paul's teaching in 1 Corinthians 11 as the basis for continual headcovering (during worship and in public) among women, particularly Saint Paul's assertions regarding the angels and that women being unveiled is dishonourable so by consequence, Christian women should cover their heads with a veil continually:

Marriage
Both the Bible and the teachings of the Church Fathers shape Anabaptist theology on the permanence of marriage.  Mennonite bishop and theologian Daniel Kauffman wrote in Doctrines of the Bible that "The ordinance [of marriage] is for the maintenance and purity of the human family (Mark 10:2-12). The teaching in the Church Polity of the Dunkard Brethren Church, a Conservative Anabaptist denomination in the Schwarzenau Brethren tradition, is reflective of Anabaptist theology regarding marriage:

Anabaptist denominations, such as the Mennonite Christian Fellowship, teach the "sinfulness of remarriage following divorce". The Biblical Mennonite Alliance holds that divorced and remarried persons are living in adultery and are therefore in "an ongoing state of sin that can only be truly forgiven when divorced and remarried persons separate."

Lord's Day

Anabaptists hold that the Lord's Day should be commemorated through the attendance of church services, along with works of mercy such as "witnessing for God in one of many ways, visiting someone who is sick or discouraged, widows, orphans, or older people, spending time with the family, studying some subject of interest in the Bible that some are wondering about, reading upbuilding literature, etc." In the view of Anabaptist Christianity, "worldly entertainment that would draw our minds away from Christ would be a poor way to commemorate His resurrection". The Statement of Faith and Practice of Salem Amish Mennonite Church, a Conservative Mennonite congregation in the Beachy Amish Mennonite tradition, is reflective of traditional Anabaptist teaching on the Lord's Day:

The Church Polity of the Dunkard Brethren Church, a Conservative Anabaptist denomination in the Schwarzenau Brethren tradition, teaches that "The First Day of the week is the Christian Sabbath and is to be kept as a day of rest and worship. (Matt. 28:1; Acts 20:7; John 20:1; Mark 16:2)"

Church discipline

The Anabaptists practiced church discipline before any of the Reformers adopted it. Reformer Martin Bucer was influenced by them to introduce discipline into the church in Strassburg, though the attempt was not successful. Bucer convinced John Calvin of the idea, and he established church discipline in Geneva. Calvin read the Schleitheim Confession in 1544 and concluded, "these unfortunate and ungrateful people have learned this teaching and some other correct views from us." Calvin was only 18 years old and still a Catholic when the Schleitheim Confession was formed in 1527.

Soteriology

Anabaptist doctrine teaches that "True faith entails a new birth, a spiritual regeneration by God's grace and power; 'believers' are those who have become the spiritual children of God." The Dunkard Brethren Church, a Conservative Anabaptist denomination in the Schwarzenau Brethren tradition, defines this as follows:

"The beginning of the Anabaptist path to salvation was thus marked not by a forensic understanding of salvation by 'faith alone', but by the entire process of repentance, self-denial, faith, rebirth and obedience. It was this process that was marked by the biblical sign of baptism." After becoming a believer, Anabaptist theology emphasizes "a faith that works."

Anabaptist denominations teach:

Hans Denck wrote:

Obedience to Jesus and other New Testament teachings, loving one another and being at peace with others, and walking in holiness are seen as "earmarks of the saved." Good works thus have an important role in the life of an Anabaptist believer, with the teaching "that faith without works is a dead faith" (cf. ) occupying a cornerstone in Anabaptist Christianity. 
Anabaptists do not teach faith and works—in the sense of two separate entities—are necessary for salvation, but rather that true faith will always produce good works. Balthasar Hubmaier wrote that "faith by itself alone is not worthy to be called faith, for there can be no true faith without the works of love."

Anabaptists "dismissed the Lutheran doctrine of justification, a dead faith as they called it, which was unable to produce Christian love and good works." Peter Riedemann wrote:

Rather than a forensic justification that only gave a legal change of one's status before God, early Anabaptists taught that "justification begun a dynamic process by which the believer partook of the nature of Christ and was so enabled to live increasingly like Jesus." Riedemann explained this ontological justification in these words:
Anabaptism seems to have influenced Jacobus Arminius. At least, he was “sympathetic to the Anabaptist point of view, and Anabaptists were commonly in attendance on his preaching.” While Anabaptism has a unique conceptualization of soteriology, the soteriological doctrines of Arminianism and Anabaptism are similar in some ways. In particular, Mennonite soteriology has been historically consistent with Arminianism, whereas the doctrines of Calvinist soteriology have been rejected. However, in the 20th century, particularly in North America, some Mennonites, have adopted the doctrine of eternal security (though Anabaptist theology traditionally teaches conditional security).

Ecclesiology
With respect to ecclesiology, Anabaptist theology "calls people to churches, where disciples of Christ strive together to deny the flesh and the world and to pattern themselves into the perfect image of their Master." The Church is "a vessel charged with delivering souls to the throne of God" and thus provides the faithful with guidelines, such as those concerning modesty.

See also

 Mennonites
 Old Colony Mennonites
 Conservative Mennonites
 Old Order Mennonite
 Martyrs Mirror

Notes and references

Citations

Sources

Further reading

 John S. Oyer: Is there an Amish Theology, in Lydie Hege et Christoph Wiebe: Les Amish : origine et particularismes 1693–1993, The Amish : origin and characteristics 1693–1993, Ingersheim, 1996, pages 278–302.
 1001 Questions and Answers on the Christian Life, written by 20 members of the Amish ministry and lay people in various communities, published by Pathway Publishers, Aylmer, Ontario and Lagrange, Indiana, 1992.
 John D. Rempel: Lords Supper In Anabaptism; A Study In The Christology Of Balthasar Hubmaier, Pilgram Marpeck, And Dirk Philips, Toronto, 1986.

 
 Robert J. Friedmann: The Theology of Anabaptism: An Interpretation,  (Studies in Anabaptist and Mennonite History), Harrisonburg, Virginia, 1973. 
 William Klassen: Covenant and Community: the Life and Writing of Pilgram Marpeck, Grand Rapids, Michigan, 1968.
 Rollin S. Armour: Anabaptist Baptism: A Representative Study, Scottdale, Pennsylvania, 1966.
 
 Franklin H. Littell: The Anabaptist View of the Church, Philadelphia, 1952.

External links
Topical articles on Anabaptist doctrine - Pilgrim Mennonite Conference
Topical Articles about Anabaptist theology - Bible Helps Publications
The Radical Reformation: Resources
Pilgrim Ministry: Anabaptist church directory
Theology of Martyrdom at Global Anabaptist Mennonite Encyclopedia Online
Mennonite Theology at Global Anabaptist Mennonite Encyclopedia Online

Anabaptism
Anabaptism
Nature of Jesus Christ